Sleith Fork is a stream in the U.S. state of West Virginia. The stream consists of Upper Sleith Fork and Lower Sleith Fork.

Sleith Fork was named for an early settler.

See also
List of rivers of West Virginia

References

Rivers of Braxton County, West Virginia
Rivers of West Virginia